Ostvorpommern was a Kreis (district) in the eastern part of Mecklenburg-Western Pomerania, Germany. Neighboring districts were (from east clockwise) Uecker-Randow, Mecklenburg-Strelitz, Demmin and Nordvorpommern. The Hanseatic city of Greifswald was enclosed by the district, but did not belong to it.

History
Ostvorpommern District was established on June 12, 1994 by merging the former districts of Anklam, Greifswald and Wolgast. It was merged into Vorpommern-Greifswald on 4 September 2011.

Coat of arms

Towns and municipalities
The subdivisions of the district were (situation August 2011):

References

External links

 Official website (German)
 Touristic website of Usedom (English, German, Polish)
 Regional Tourist Board Vorpommern (English, German, Swedish, Polish)

Former districts of Mecklenburg-Western Pomerania